Wesser Tenza (born 19 August 1992) is a Papua New Guinean professional rugby league footballer who plays as a  for the Papua New Guinea Hunters in the Queensland Cup and Papua New Guinea at international level.

Background
Tenza was born in Southern Highlands Province, Papua New Guinea.

Playing career

Club career
Tenza debuted in the 2022 Queensland Cup for the PNG Hunters.

International career
In 2022 Tenza was named in the Papua New Guinea squad for the 2021 Rugby League World Cup.

In October 2022 he made his international début for Papua New Guinea against Wales.

References

External links
Papua New Guinea Hunters profile
Papua New Guinea profile

1992 births
Living people
Papua New Guinea national rugby league team players
Papua New Guinean rugby league players
Rugby league hookers